A list of Bangladeshi films released in 1984.

Releases

References

See also

1984 in Bangladesh
List of Bangladeshi films
Cinema of Bangladesh

Film
Lists of 1984 films by country or language
 1984